Protein SSX5 is a protein that in humans is encoded by the SSX5 gene.

Function 

The product of this gene belongs to the family of highly homologous synovial sarcoma, X (SSX) breakpoint proteins. These proteins may function as transcriptional repressors. They are also capable of eliciting spontaneously humoral and cellular immune responses in cancer patients, and are potentially useful targets in cancer vaccine-based immunotherapy. SSX1, SSX2 and SSX4 genes have been involved in the t(X;18) chromosomal translocation characteristically found in all synovial sarcomas. This gene appears not to be involved in this type of translocation. Two transcript variants encoding distinct isoforms have been identified for this gene.

References

Further reading